Dağlı Castle is a castle ruin in Mersin Province, Turkey

Geography
Although there is a vehicle road to the village, there is no road from the village to castle. Although a short portion of ancient castle road survives, the castle is accessible only through walking and partial climbing from the village.

History
The castle was built during the Roman Empire. But it was used during the Byzantine Empire and the Armenian Kingdom of Cilicia. It probably controlled ancient and medieval caravan routes.

The castle
The castle is on a hill overlooking Karakız valley. Most of the buildings as well as the walls are in ruins. But a big room, known as the queen’s room, survives. There are also two small compartments which are thought to be toilet and some dark quarters which may be dungeons. Next to the main gate there is a rock relief showing two soldiers and one pregnant woman. There is also a highly effaced inscription. Although it was thought to be in Armenian, up to now only a few words could be deciphered. According to Professor  Bogos Levon Zekiyan, only four words are readable; to son, Armenians, king and date.

References

External links
For images

Erdemli District
Roman archaeology
Byzantine fortifications in Turkey
Ruined castles in Turkey
Castles in Mersin Province
Archaeological sites in Mersin Province, Turkey